The Klung Wilhelmy Science Award is an annual German award in the field of science, alternating annually between the categories of chemistry and physics. It is bestowed upon outstanding younger German scientists under the age of 40.

Previous award names 
1973 to 2001 – Otto-Klung-Award
2001 to 2007 – Otto-Klung-Weberbank-Award
2007 to 2013 – Klung-Wilhelmy-Weberbank-Award

Selection process 
The prizewinners are selected by permanent committees at the Institutes of Chemistry and Biochemistry and the Department of Physics at the Free University of Berlin, with additional input from professors at other universities. Proposals and nominations by nationally and internationally renowned scientists are also taken into consideration. Self-nominations will not be accepted.

The final decision on the selection recommendations is made by the following foundations: the Otto Klung Foundation at the Free University of Berlin and the Dr. Wilhelmy Foundation. The stated aim of these foundations is to strengthen the promotion of outstanding scientific achievements and to reward internationally accredited innovative approaches. Five of the previously chosen prizewinners later received the Nobel Prize.

The prize was first awarded in 1973 by the Otto Klung Foundation. Since 2007, the prize has become one of the highest privately funded scientific endowments in Germany. The annual award ceremony, which has been held in November, is open to the public.

Recipients 

From 1973 to 1978, the Otto Klung Foundation acting alone and trying to foster young academics presented the Otto-Klung-Award as a Junior Researcher Prize for outstanding scientific achievement to graduate students and postdoctoral students of the Free University of Berlin, Departments of Chemistry and Physics:

Klaus-Peter Dinse (Physics 1973), Wolf-Dietrich Hunnius and Rolf Minkwitz (Chemistry 1974), Michael Grunze (Chemistry 1975), Günther Kerker (Physics 1976), Wolfgang Lubitz (Chemistry 1977), Andreas Gaupp (Physics 1978).

See also

 List of chemistry awards
 List of physics awards

Notes

External links
 

German awards
Physics awards
Chemistry awards
Early career awards
Awards established in 1973